Joshua Vanneck may refer to:
 Joshua Vanneck, 1st Baron Huntingfield, British merchant and politician
 Joshua Vanneck, 2nd Baron Huntingfield, British peer and politician
 Sir Joshua Vanneck, 1st Baronet, British-Dutch merchant